Cranmoor is an unincorporated community located in the town of Cranmoor, Wood County, Wisconsin, United States.

The name "Cranmoor", an amalgamation of cranberry and moor, was adopted in 1898 for the community's role as a trading center of cranberries. A post office was established at Cranmoor in 1898, and remained in operation until 1932.

Notes

External links
 1909 plat map of Cranmoor
 1928 plat map

Unincorporated communities in Wood County, Wisconsin
Unincorporated communities in Wisconsin